Robert Harper (born August 18, 1965) is an American personal trainer, reality television personality, and author. He appeared on the American television series The Biggest Loser. On September 8, 2015, Harper was announced as new host of The Biggest Loser, succeeding Alison Sweeney. He was an advisor on The New Celebrity Apprentice.

Career
Harper has worked as a personal trainer for celebrity clients, including Jennifer Jason Leigh. In 1999, he was cast as an extra in Melissa Etheridge's hit video for the song "Angels Would Fall" from her album Breakdown.  He is featured as a trainer on the United States version of The Biggest Loser reality television series.  He has been a trainer on the NBC show since 2004. and has appeared in several Biggest Loser DVD workouts.  Harper is also featured in the first three seasons of the Australian version of the show.

In addition to making appearances, speaking dates, and writing, Harper teaches regular classes in Los Angeles and works as a yoga instructor.

In early 2010, Harper launched mytrainerbob.com, a website where subscribers could discuss weight loss and receive coaching. The success of his site led to the release of his first workout DVD series in May, titled "Bob Harper: Inside Out Method." Harper has also contributed workouts to the Shape magazine website.

Personal life
Harper was born in Nashville. He attended Austin Peay State University in Clarksville, Tennessee, however he did not graduate.

After reading the book Skinny Bitch, Harper became a vegetarian. In 2010, he then became a vegan.  In 2013 Harper stopped following a vegan diet because "my body personally got to a point where I needed something more." He practices Transcendental Meditation. He is an avid CrossFit athlete.

Harper has spoken out against puppy mills and has adopted a black and white dog from the Animal Advocates Alliance in Baldwin Park, California.  He named the dog Karl, after Karl Lagerfeld, because of the dog's color.

Harper is Farm Sanctuary's 2010 Walk for Farm Animals national spokesman.

Harper publicly came out as gay in the seventh episode of the fifteenth season of The Biggest Loser, while talking to a contestant who was having difficulty telling his parents about his sexuality. Harper revealed he had come out to his parents at 17, but that this was his first time ever addressing his sexuality publicly in his career. The episode aired on November 28, 2013.

On February 12, 2017, Harper suffered a heart attack; his survival being a subject for his commercial for the Brilinta medication.

Bibliography

Harper, Bob (2017). The Super Carb Diet. St. Martin's Press. .

References

External links

 MyTrainerBob.com 
 Bob Harper at NBC
 CrossFit athlete profile
 

1965 births
Living people
21st-century American non-fiction writers
American exercise and fitness writers
American exercise instructors
American male non-fiction writers
Television personalities from Los Angeles
Gay sportsmen
American gay writers
LGBT people from California
LGBT people from Tennessee
Sportspeople from Nashville, Tennessee
Writers from Los Angeles
American LGBT sportspeople
21st-century American male writers
21st-century LGBT people